Still a Hot Boy is the fourth album released by rapper, Turk. It was released on September 15, 2005, through Laboratory Records and featured production from Kenoe, DJ Toomp, Drumma Boy. This was Turk's first album not to make it to any charts.

Track listing
"Live from the Lab" (feat. Ke'Noe) - 1:30  
"Get It How I Live" (feat. Ke'Noe & S.S.) - 4:20  
"Gun Line" (feat. Don Trip & Syco)- 5:19  
"Old Timer (Conversation)"- 1:03  
"I Ain't Never Heard" (feat. S.S., Chamillionare & Ke'Noe) - 3:50  
"Calling Out" (feat. Bun B & S.S.) - 4:00 
"Life Is a Gamble [Remix]"- 3:58  
"Real Down Here" (feat. Doc Holiday) - 4:26  
"Jail House Freestyle" (feat. Lady Turk) - 2:38  
"T-Gizel (Skit)"- 0:15  
"Poor Man Dreams" (feat. Suga-Suga & Goldie) - 3:42  
"I'm Telling Ya" (feat. Ke'Noe & Lil' D) - 4:14  
"Ain't No Fun" (feat. Criminal Manne) - 2:45  
"Lady Turk (Skit)"- 1:06  
"Penitentiary Chances [Remix]"- 4:33

2005 albums
Turk (rapper) albums